The 1865 Wisconsin gubernatorial election was held on November 7, 1865. Republican Party candidate Lucius Fairchild won the election with nearly 55% of the vote, defeating Democratic candidate Harrison Carroll Hobart.

The incumbent Governor, James T. Lewis, refused nomination for re-election.

The American Civil War had concluded just a few months before this election was held; both major party candidates in this election were retired brigadier generals who had served with distinction in the war.

Democratic Party
Harrison Carroll Hobart had served as a Union Army officer through the entire war, rising from captain to brigadier general, operating as colonel of the 21st Wisconsin Infantry Regiment and brigadier in XIV Corps in the western theater of the war.  He was captured and escaped captivity during the war.  Prior to the war, Hobart had served in the Wisconsin State Assembly, and had served as Speaker of the Assembly in the 1849 session.  He had also served as in the Wisconsin State Senate during the 1st Wisconsin Legislature.  This was Hobart's second attempt at election for Governor of Wisconsin, having been defeated by Alexander Randall in the 1859 election.

Republican Party
Lucius Fairchild was the incumbent Wisconsin Secretary of State at the time of the 1865 election, having been elected in the 1863 election on the Democratic Party ticket.  Fairchild was one of the first Wisconsin men to volunteer for service in the Union Army, rising from captain to colonel with the 2nd Wisconsin Infantry Regiment in the famous Iron Brigade in the eastern theater of the war.  He led the regiment in fierce fighting during the first day of the Battle of Gettysburg.  At Gettysburg, Fairchild was wounded and captured.  He was quickly released from captivity, but his left arm had been crushed and had to be amputated.  He returned to Madison to recuperate, and was then nominated for Wisconsin Secretary of State.  President Lincoln awarded him an honorary promotion to brigadier general.

Results

| colspan="6" style="text-align:center;background-color: #e9e9e9;"| General Election, November 7, 1865

References

1865
1865 Wisconsin elections
Wisconsin